The following is a list of recordings by Vietnamese pop-singer Mỹ Tâm.

Studio albums

Mãi Yêu (Endless Love) (2001)
This album contains the following tracks:

 Yêu Dại Khờ (Stupid Love)
 Hai Mươi (Twenty)
 Tình Mơ (Dreams of You)
 Nhé Anh (Please, Dear)
 Em Của Tôi (Honey)
 Sóng (Waves)
 Mãi Yêu (Endless Love)
 Bài Ca Đêm (Song Of The Night)
 Hãy Nói Với Em (with Bằng Kiều) (Talk To Me)
 Khúc Nhạc Tình Yêu (The Melody of Love)
 "On the Breath of an Angel" -  Anggun cover
 Tóc Nâu Môi Trầm (Brown hair, Dark Lips) (Bonus Track) (Written by: Quốc Bảo)

Source: nhasachphuongnam.com

Đâu Chỉ Riêng Em (I'm Not The Only One) (2002)
Note: Not to be confused with her lead single from "Tâm 9", which would be apparently released in 2017 - ĐÂU CHỈ RIÊNG EM. This album contains the following tracks:
 "Lời Mở Đầu" (Intro: Vol.02)
 "Búp Bê Không Tình Yêu" (A Doll Without Love) - Cover of "Poupée de cire, poupée de son" by France Gall
 Giấc Mơ Tình Yêu (Love Dream)
Khung Trời Mộng Mơ (Dreamscapes)
Khi Xưa Ta Bé (BANG BANG) - Cover of "Bang Bang (My Baby Shot Me Down)" by Cher
Tình Xót Xa Thôi (A Lament For Lost Love)
Thank You - Dido cover 
Chiếc Nhẫn Cỏ (The Grass Ring)
Một Lần Và Mãi Mãi (Once & Forever)
Ánh Sao Buồn (Blue starlight)
Tình Yêu Trong Lành (Pure Heart)
Hát Cho Người Ở Lại (Sing For You To Stay)

Yesterday & Now (2003)
This album contains the following tracks:

 Lời mở đầu (Intro - Vol.03)
Ngỡ đâu tình đã quên mình (Thought That Love Forgot About Me)
Ước gì (I WISH)
Đêm thấy ta là thác đổ (Nighttime Memories)
Tình em còn mãi (My Heart Won't Change) Cover of "真心" by Sally Yeh
Mùa hè thương yêu (Love Summer Goodbye) 
Bóng cả (The Shadow)
Họa mi tóc nâu (Brunette Nightingale)
Đường xưa (Old Ways)
Bốn mùa và em (Seasons)
Về chốn thiên đường (Back To Heaven) Cover of "Comme Toi" by Jean Jacques Goldman
You're Not From Here - Cover of "You're Not From Here" by Lara Fabian
Niềm tin chiến thắng (WE ARE THE CHAMPIONS)
Khúc yêu thương (ASEREJE) - Cover of "Asereje" by Las Ketchup

Hoàng Hôn Thức Giấc (The Color of My Life) (2005) 
It contains the following tracks:

 "Lời Mở Đầu" (Vol.4 Intro)
 "Giấc Mơ Muôn Màu" (Vivid Dream)
 "Nhớ..." (I Miss You)
 "Rồi Mai Thức Giấc" (When Tomorrow Comes)
 "Giấc Mơ Mùa Thu" (Autumn Fantasies)
 "Có Phải Ta Chia Tay" (Is This Goodbye?)
 "Đánh Thức Mùa Thu" (Awakening The Fall)
 "Em Đã Yêu Anh" (I Fell For You)
 "Nụ Hôn Bất Ngờ" (Oh First Kiss!)
 "Nhịp Đập Dại Khờ" (Mistaken Heartbeat)
 "Người Yêu Dấu Ơi" (Lover) - Cover of "Koibito Yo" by Mayumi Itsuwa
 "Em Hãy Ngủ Đi" (Sleep tight, Darling)
 "Không Còn Yêu" (Love No More)
 "Rồi Anh Sẽ Quên" (You Will Forget Them All)
 "Vì Đâu" (How Come?)

Dường Như Ta Đã: Vol 4,5  // (We Seemed to Be...) - Vol.4,5 Reissue (2006)

This album contains the following tracks:

Nhớ [I miss you] (Alternative Version)
Ước Gì [I WISH] (Alternative Version)
Tình Về Mai Sau (Love Goes On)
Nhiều Khi (Sometimes)
Tình Phai (Faded Away)
Yêu Dại Khờ [Foolish Love] (Rock version)
Mặt Trời Trong Em (Sun On you)
Dường Như Ta Đã (We Seemed To Be...)
Đóa Hoa Vô Thường (The Bouquet of Impermanent)
Lên Đàng 
Niềm Tin Chiến Thắng / WE ARE THE CHAMPIONS (Rock version)

Source: Zing

Vút Bay (Fly) (2006)
Fly was the first My Tam album produced in Korea, and contains four re-recorded tracks in Korean. This album contains the following tracks, shown with Korean re-recordings:

 Tình nồng (True Love)
 Hãy Đến Với Em (I Know You Know)
 Giọt sương (The Dewdrop)
 Dường như ta đã... (We Seemed To Be...) (Korean Version)
 Bí Mật (SECRET)
 Khóc một mình (I Will)
 Tình yêu chưa nói (How Can I Say I Love You?)
 Ngày hôm nay (TODAY...)
 Ô cửa sổ (The Window)
 Giấc mơ mùa hè (Summerdream)
 Em chờ anh (Waiting For You)
 Hãy đến với em (I know You Know) (Korean Version)
 Giọt sương (The Dewdrop) (Korean Version)
 Ngày hôm nay (TODAY...) (Korean Version)

Trở Lại (The Return) (2008)

 Như Em Đợi Anh (I've Been waiting)
 Cơn Mưa Dĩ Vãng (The Rain from The Past)
 Khi Tình Yêu Trở Lại (When Love Returns)
 Mưa Và Nỗi Nhớ (Raindrops Down The Memory Lane)
 Hurt So much
 Vì Em Đã Biết (Now That I Know)
 Chỉ Có Thể Là Tình Yêu (It Must Be Love)
 Và Em Có Anh (I Got You)
 Cô Gái Đến Từ Hôm Qua (The Girl Came from Yesterday)
 Một Ngày Mùa Đông (Winter Days)
 Hơi Ấm Ngày Xưa (Old Devotion)
 Vẫn Hát Lời Tình Yêu (Keep On Singing My Lovesongs)

Nhịp Đập (TO THE BEAT) (2008)

 Quên Đi Ngày Yêu Dấu (BOY BYE)
 Ngày Anh Ra Đi (THE DAY YOU WALK AWAY)
 Nhớ Anh Thật Nhiều (THINKIN OF YOU)
 Vũ Điệu France Cho Anh (I DANCE FOR YOU)
 Về Đi Anh (COME HOME BABY)
 Chỉ Tình Yêu Anh Mất (IT'S NOT ME, IT'S YOU)
 Lạc Lối (LOST)
 Mưa Khóc (RAIN OF TEARS)
 Tic Tac Toe 
 Niềm Tin (DO IT!)

Tâm (self-titled) (2013) 
This album contains the following tracks:

 "Gửi Tình Yêu Của Em" (Letter To My Love)
 "Giữa Hai Chúng Ta" (The Two Of Us)
 "Còn Lại" (Hurt)
 "Như Một Giấc Mơ" (Like A Dream)
 "Vì Em Quá Yêu Anh" (Crazy Love)
 "Sự Thật Ta Yêu Nhau" (THE TRUTH)
 "My Friend"
 "Lại Một Đêm Mưa" (Rainy Night)
 "Một Phút Cô Đơn" (Lonely)
 "Sai" (Wrong) - 2013 Rework Album Version

Tâm 9 (2017) 

 Đừng Hỏi Em (Don't Ask Me)
 Cô Ấy Là Ai? (Who Is She?)
 Anh Chưa Từng Biết (You Never Know)
 Nếu Có Buông Tay (If You Let Go)
 Đau Thế Mà (Hurts Like This)
 Mong Cho Anh (Wish You The Best)
Lạnh Lùng (COLD)
 Muộn Màng Là Từ Lúc (Late From The Beginning)
 Biết Khi Nào Gặp Lại (When Can I See You Again?)
 Nếu Anh Đi (When You're Gone)
 Chuyện Buồn (Sad Story)
 Đâu Chỉ Riêng Em (Not Only Me)
 Người Hãy Quên Em Đi (Please Forget Me)  (hidden track)

Compilation albums

Những Giai Điệu Thời Gian (Melodies of Time) (2010) 
This album contains the following tracks:

 "Chuyện Tình Không Suy Tư" (Thoughtless Love)
 "Xin Thời Gian Qua Mau" (Please Time, Go Quick)
 "Bản Tình Cuối" (The Last LoveSong)
 "Những Bước Chân Âm Thầm" (Silent Footsteps)
 "Đợi Yêu" (Wait for Love)
 "Sao Em Còn Buồn" (Why Are You Still Sad?)
 "Em Đã Thấy Mùa Xuân Chưa" (Have You Seen The Spring Yet?)
 "Đoản Khúc Cuối Cho Em" (Your Last Perish Song)
 "Chuyện Hợp Tan" (Loving and Heartbreak)
 "Có Một Dòng Sông Đã Qua Đời" (Forgotten River)

Những Giai Điệu Thời Gian 2: Quê Hương Đất Nước (Melodies of Time Pt.2: Motherland) (2010) 
This album contains the following tracks:

 "Làng Tôi" (The Village)
 "Bèo Dạt Mây Trôi" (Water-Ferns Drifting, Clouds Floating) Note: This is an idiom for uncertainty.
 "Câu Hò Bên Bờ Hiền Lương" (The Hien Luong River Song)
 "Em Vẫn Đợi Anh Về" (I Still Wait for You)
 "Thành Phố Tình Yêu và Nỗi Nhớ" (City of Love and Memories)
 "Em Còn Nhớ Hay Em Đã Quên" (Do You Still Remember Me, or Have You Forgotten?)
 "Tạm Biệt Chim Én" (Goodbye, Swallow)
 "Quê Hương Tuổi Thơ Tôi" (My Childhood Hometown)
 "Nhớ Về Hà Nội" (Old Hanoi)
 "Đâu Phải Bởi Mùa Thu" (It's Not Because It's Autumn)

Single albums

Cây đàn sinh viên (2002)

Hát với dòng sông (2002)

Ban mai tình yêu (2002)

Singles
A list of My Tam's notable single releases.

Audio Singles and EPs
My Tam released these singles and extended plays on CD and other formats:

 "Thoát ly" (Outbreak) (2001)
 "Cây đàn sinh viên" (The Guitar of Students) (March 2002) including title track, "Quê hương tuổi thơ tôi" (Hometown - My Childhood) and "Tiếng lòng xao động" (Love awakes)
 "Ban mai tình yêu" (Dawn of Love) (May 2002) including title track, "Tình lỡ cách xa" (Love leaves by mistake) and "Vấn vương" (Longing)
 "Dấu chấm hỏi" (?) (2002)
 "Hát với dòng sông" (Serenading with the River) (2002)
 "Giai điệu tình yêu: Tiếng hát Mỹ Tâm" (Love Melody - My Tam) (2003) including various tracks such as "Đôi cánh tình yêu" (Wings of Love) and "Hãy tha thứ cho em" (Please Forgive Me)
Cho một tình yêu - EP (For Love - EP) (2011) - including different versions of the title track

Video Singles
My Tam released these video singles and extended plays on VCD and other formats:
 "Hát Với Dòng Sông" (Sing with the River) (May 2002) - includes title track, "The Student Guitar" and "My Childhood Hometown" ( VCD )
 Mãi Yêu (Endless Love) (after 2003) - includes "Xích Lô" (Pedicab) ( VCD )

1990s

2000s

2010s

2020s

Promotional single

Notes

References

Discographies of Vietnamese artists